"Opasan" ("Dangerous") is a song recorded by Serbian pop recording artist Dara Bubamara. It was self-released 24 January 2014. The song was written by Slobodan Veljković and Stefan Đurić. It was produced and recorded in Belgrade.

The music video for "Opasan" was shot in early January 2014 and premiered 25 January.

References

External links
Opasan at Discogs

2014 singles
2014 songs